Juan Castañer Ponce Enrile Jr. (born July 16, 1958), also known as Jack Enrile or JPEJ, is a Filipino politician. He was a representative of the 1st District of Cagayan in the 11th, 12th, 13th and 15th Congresses. He is the only son and namesake of former Senate President Juan Ponce Enrile of Cagayan and the former ambassador to the Holy See, Cristina Castañer of Manila. He is married to former Cagayan Province Congresswoman Salvacion “Sally” Santiago. Sally traces her roots to the Santiagos of Angat and Guiguinto, Bulacan.

Education
Jack attended Ateneo de Manila University in the Philippines from Preparatory School (1972) until High School (1976). He then earned a Bachelor of Arts in English degree from Christian Heritage College, El Cajon, California in 1993. He also obtained a Presidential master's degree in business administration from Pepperdine University, Malibu, California (1995). He recently completed the Digital Business Leadership Program at Columbia University Business School, New York, in 2017.

Personal life
Jack Enrile is married to Sally Ponce Enrile with whom he has two children, Sara Simone (Sara) and Samuel (Sam). He has two daughters from a previous relationship: Kristine Kamille (Kriska) and Maria Karina (Ina). He has a grandchild, Matteo.

Political career
His political career started in 1998 as representative of the 1st District of Cagayan in the Congress of the Philippines, serving from 1998 to 2007 and from 2010 to 2013. He is the principal author of the Batas Kasambahay, Food for Filipinos First, Credit Access and Protection Reform and the Anti-Monopoly Bill. He ran for a seat in the Senate in 2013, but lost. He ran again in 2016 to get back his previous position as representative of the 1st District of Cagayan but lost to Ramon Nolasco.

Corporate background
Enrile was appointed president and chief executive officer of JAKA Investments Corporation and the JAKA Group of Companies from 1994 to 1998.

He founded the Philippine Practical Shooting Association (PPSA) In 1982. He was the president of PPSA.  Enrile was also the regional director of the International Practical Shooting Confederation.

Civic membership
Ponce Enrile is a reservist of the 4th Philippine Marine Brigade.

References

External links
Jack Enrile

|-

|-

Living people
1958 births
Nationalist People's Coalition politicians
People from Cagayan
Ateneo de Manila University alumni
Pepperdine University alumni
Members of the House of Representatives of the Philippines from Cagayan